Harder Than It Looks is the sixth studio album by Canadian rock band Simple Plan, released on May 6, 2022. It is their first record in six years since Taking One for the Team (2016), and the first one without bassist David Desrosiers after his sexual misconduct allegations.

Background and production 
The band stated that the album will be a return to their pop-punk roots. This is the band's first album to be released since the departure of longtime bassist David Desrosiers after his sexual misconduct allegations, although the band hinted in 2018 at his involvement within the recording process via Instagram.

Track listing

Personnel 
Credits adapted from the album's booklet.

Simple Plan
 Pierre Bouvier – lead vocals, piano on "Wake Me Up (When This Nightmare's Over)", additional programming, keyboards
 Chuck Comeau – drums
 Sebastien Lefebvre – rhythm guitars, backing vocals
 Jeff Stinco – lead guitar
 David Desrosiers – bass, backing vocals

Additional musicians
 Deryck Whibley - guest vocals (track 2)

Production
 Pierre Bouvier - producer
 Brian Howes - producer
 Zakk Cervini – producer, mixing
 Chris Lord-Alge – mixing (track 10)
 Jason "JVP" Van Poederooyen – producer, mixing (track 6), engineering
 Ted Jensen – mastering

Design
 Chapman Baehler – album photography
 Simple Plan – art direction and concept
 Fred Jérôme – art direction and concept, layout design

Charts

References 

2022 albums
Simple Plan albums